Uzhavukkum Thozhilukkum Vandhanai Seivom is a 1959 Indian Tamil-language drama film directed by M. A. Thirumugam. The film stars Prem Nazir and E. V. Saroja.

Plot 

After the death of her husband a poor woman tries to bring up her two young sons. The elder son is taken by a rich mill owner and brought up as a wealthy young man who eventually owns the mill. The younger son grows up in poverty and goes to work as a labourer in the mill. But the two do not know they are brothers. Both set their eyes on the same girl. The elder brother dismisses the younger brother and chases him away. He goes to live with the mother. The younger brother cultivates a piece of land and within a few years, he becomes a well-to-do person. Many mill workers leave the mill and go to work on the farm. The elder brother plans to destroy the farm and the workers settlements. However, his girlfriend doesn't like this and sends word to the farm about the plot. The workers are saved. The elder brother plans to do away with the girlfriend and the younger brother. The rest of the story tells whether his plan succeeded, whether the farm becomes prosperous and whether the brothers are united.

Cast 
The details are compiled from the song book and from the database of Film News Anandan.

Male cast
Prem Nazir
O. A. K. Thevar
D. Balasubramaniam
A. Karunanidhi
V. R. Rajagopal
S. S. Kathiresan
Kottappuli Jayaraman

Female cast
E. V. Saroja
P. Kannamba
M. N. Rajam
Gamini
Rajeswari
Radhabhai

Junior cast
Master Gopal
Master Varma

Soundtrack 
Music was composed by K. V. Mahadevan, while the lyrics were penned by A. Maruthakasi, Kannadasan and T. K. Sundara Vathiyar.

References

External links 
 

1950s Tamil-language films
1959 drama films
1959 films
Films directed by M. A. Thirumugam
Films scored by K. V. Mahadevan
Indian drama films